Graham Dugald Duncan(born 1959) is a South African botanist and specialist bulb horticulturalist at the Kirstenbosch National Botanical Garden, Cape Town, South Africa.

Life 

Graham Duncan was born in 1959 and grew up in the Western Cape region amongst its wild bulbous plants. He obtained his early education at the Cape Town Technikon with a National Diploma in horticulture, and joined the Kirstenbosch National Botanical Garden, Cape Town, South Africa in 1978, where he came under the influence of Winsome Fanny Barker (1907–1994), then curator of the Compton Herbarium at Kirstenbosch and a Lachenalia specialist. He earned his MSc (cum laude) in Botany at the University of KwaZulu-Natal, Pietermaritzburg in 2005.

Work 

Graham Duncan is a specialist horticulturalist for geophytes and curates the indigenous South African geophytes collection at Kirstenbosch Botanical Garden. These are displayed in the Kay Bergh Bulb House at the Kirstenbosch Conservatory. He is considered an authority on the cultivation, conservation, propagation and biology of bulbs of the Cape region, and the leading expert on the genus Lachenalia. His research deals with the biology and taxonomy of Cape bulbs.

Other than his work on Lachenalia he is known for his expertise on Nerine, Eucomis and Agapanthus. As well as identifying a number of South African plants, he has also bred cultivars such as Clivia miniata 'Kirstenbosch Splendour', which illustrates the cover of the Kirstenbosch centenary book (2013).

He is the author of numerous books, including several titles in the Kirstenbosch Gardening Series, scientific papers and popular articles on South African bulbous plants. He is also a plant collector and plant photographer (see image) and his photographs illustrate his  own books and have been published in The Smallest Kingdom: Plants and Plant Collectors at the Cape of Good Hope (2011).

Awards 

In 1989, he was awarded the Recht Malan Prize for non-fiction (1989) from the Nasionale Boekhandel for his Bulbous plants of southern Africa  and in 2001 he was the recipient of the International Bulb Society's Herbert Medal.

Legacy 

The International Plant Names Index lists 54 taxa named by him, predominantly species of Lachenalia.

Selected publications

Books

Kirstenbosch Gardening Series

Articles

References

Bibliography

Books and monographs

Articles and websites 

 
 
 , at 
 
 , at 
 , at 
 
 
 , in

Works by Graham Duncan 

 
 
 
 
 
 

 
 
 
 
 

 
 , in 
 
 
 
 
 
 
 

 
 
 
 
 
, in 
 , in

External links 
 Photograph of Duncan Graham photographing plants on location

University of KwaZulu-Natal alumni
20th-century South African botanists
Botanists with author abbreviations
1959 births
Living people
21st-century South African botanists